Hungry for Stink is the fourth studio album by L7, released in July 1994 by Slash Records. The album peaked at number 117 on the Billboard 200 chart, as well as number 2 on the Heatseekers Albums chart.

"Fuel My Fire" was based on the Cosmic Psychos song "Lost Cause", and was covered by The Prodigy on their 1997 album The Fat of the Land. The Independent reported that the album's name Hungry for Stink was derived from an advert the band saw in Bear Magazine, a gay publication "for and about big hairy men".

Critical reception
AllMusic reviewer Stephen Thomas Erlewine noted that "While L7 sounds tremendous on Hungry for Stink, the band has neglected to write any songs", but added "But when you're caught in the middle of a massive guitar grind this good, songs don't matter much." Rolling Stone stated: "Chief songwriter Donita Sparks and company kick inter-gender butt by means of power chords and grunge abandon."

Track listing

Personnel
Credits adapted from liner notes.

Performers
 Donita Sparks – guitar, lead vocals (on tracks 2, 3, 5, 6, 8, 10 and 12)
 Suzi Gardner – guitar, lead vocals (on tracks 1, 7 and 9)
 Jennifer Finch – bass guitar, lead vocals (on tracks 4 and 11)
 Demetra Plakas – drums

Production
 GGGarth – production

Charts

References

External links
 

1994 albums
L7 (band) albums
Albums produced by Garth Richardson
Slash Records albums
Albums recorded at Sound City Studios